"Hooray! Hooray! It's a Holi-Holiday" is a 1979 single by German Euro disco band Boney M. as an adaptation of nursery rhyme Polly Wolly Doodle. Despite breaking their row of 7 consecutive German #1 singles, peaking at #4, the single was a big hit all over Europe, peaking at #3 in the UK. The song and its B-side, "Ribbons of Blue", were taken from the movie Disco Fever. "Ribbons of Blue" has a strong country feel with the addition of a pedal steel guitar. Even though the single cover announced the arrival of the next Boney M. album, Oceans of Fantasy, it would still be another six months before the album was released, and of the two songs, only "Ribbons of Blue" (penned by the group's drummer, Keith Forsey) was included and just in a one- or two-minute edit, depending on the pressing.

Single
Unlike other Boney M. singles, there appears to be no different mixes. In Germany, this was the first single to picture a specially designed label with a star-spangled Boney M. logo on a blue background. In the UK, the single was released in a picture sleeve – it was also pressed on a picture disc and a 12" clear yellow vinyl with card picture cover insert.

Reception
Smash Hits said, "If a knees-up in a holiday camp is your idea of a good time, then you might possibly - just possibly - enjoy this excruciatingly dreadful singalongaboney. But make no mistake, whether you love it or hate it, you will hear it.

Releases
7" singles
 "Hooray! Hooray! It's a Holi-Holiday" (3:56) / "Ribbons of Blue" (4:02) – (Hansa Int. 100 444–100, Germany)
 "Hooray! Hooray! It's a Holi-Holiday" (3:56) / "Ribbons of Blue" (4:02) – (Atlantic K 11279 / Picture disc K 11279P, UK)

12" single
 "Hooray! Hooray! It's a Holi-Holiday" (3:56) / "Ribbons of Blue" (4:02) – (Atlantic K 11279T, UK)

"Hooray! Hooray! (Caribbean Night Fever)"

"Hooray! Hooray! (Caribbean Night Fever)" is a Double A-side Boney M. single from 1999 with a new remix of their 1979 hit "Hooray! Hooray! It's a Holi-Holiday" and a Megamix of their hits "Brown Girl in the Ring", "Hooray! Hooray! It's a Holi-Holiday" and "No Woman No Cry", all taken from their remix album 20th Century Hits, released at the same time. The single fared poorly, peaking at just #79 in the German charts and #80 in the Swiss charts. After producer Frank Farian had dropped the idea of launching an all-new Boney M. line-up with young people, he announced that original lead singer Liz Mitchell and her Boney M. line-up would promote the album before dropping this idea again. Consequently, the accompanying video featured a cartoon movie of the original group. The 12" single featured "Tropical" and "Carnival" mixes, both unavailable on CD.

Releases
CD
 Boney M. 2000: "Hooray! Hooray! (Caribbean Night Fever)" (BMG 74321 71064 2, 1999) 
 "Caribbean Night Fever – Megamix" (Radio Edit) – 3:55 
 "Hooray! Hooray! It's a Holi-Holiday" (Radio Edit) – 3:30 
 "Caribbean Night Fever" (Extended Version) – 5:28 
 "Hooray! Hooray! It's a Holi-Holiday" (Extended Version) – 4:26 
 "Brown Girl in the Ring" (Remix) – 4:01

12" single
 Boney M. 2000: "Hooray! Hooray! (Caribbean Night Fever)" (BMG 74321 71114 1, 1999)
"Caribbean Night Fever – Megamix" (Extended Version) – 5:26 / "Hooray! Hooray! It's a Holi-Holiday" (Extended Version) – 4:26 / "Caribbean Tropical Mix" – 6:02 / "Caribbean Carnival Mix" – 6:02

Chart positions

Chart positions

Certifications

Cover versions

The Spanish group Parchís covered the song on their first LP under the same title, but sung completely in Spanish by the two female vocalists in the group: Gemma and Yolanda.
Hong Kong singer Susanna Kwan covered the song in Cantonese in 1979 as "Summer Delight" (夏日多歡享 ha yat dor foon heung) on her album Wing han dik foo pak (永恒的琥珀).
Danish singer Birthe Kjær covered the song in Danish in 1980 as "Hurra! Hurra! Sikken dejlig dag".
Ricky Martin covered the song in Spanish in 1993 on his album Me Amarás.
The Cheeky Girls did a cover of this song, "(Hooray, Hooray) It's a Cheeky Holiday", as a follow-up to their successful debut single "Cheeky Song (Touch My Bum)". Their version gave them their third top-five hit in the UK, peaking at number three.

References

1979 singles
1999 singles
2003 singles
Boney M. songs
European Hot 100 Singles number-one singles
Hansa Records singles
Multiply Records singles
Song recordings produced by Frank Farian
Songs written by Frank Farian